Urodacus armatus, also known as the yellow sand scorpion or inland desert scorpion, is a species of scorpion in the Urodacidae family. It is native to Australia. It was first described in 1888 by British zoologist Reginald Innes Pocock.

Description
The species grows to 30-60 mm in length. Colouring is usually light sandy with dark red leg joints.

Distribution and habitat
The species is found over much of arid inland Australia on a variety of soils.

Behaviour
The scorpions build short burrows and hunt small invertebrates through both active foraging and by ambushing their prey from the branches and foliage of low vegetation.

References

 

 
armatus
Scorpions of Australia
Endemic fauna of Australia
Fauna of New South Wales
Fauna of the Northern Territory
Fauna of South Australia
Fauna of Victoria (Australia)
Fauna of Western Australia
Animals described in 1888
Taxa named by R. I. Pocock